The men's tournament marked the second Olympic Games where the National Hockey League took a break (12 days, from February 14 to February 25) to allow all its players the opportunity to play.

Fourteen countries played in the tournament. Six hockey powers (Canada, the Czech Republic, Finland, Russia, Sweden, and the United States) were automatically admitted to the final eight. The other eight countries (Austria, Belarus, France, Germany, Latvia, Slovakia, Switzerland, and Ukraine) played in a preliminary round in two pools. The winners of those pools, Belarus and Germany, advanced to the final round with the six hockey powers.

The biggest surprise of the tournament was Belarus, 0–3–0 in Group D play, knocking off 3–0–0 Sweden in quarterfinal play. After that upset, the Swedish media held their players responsible for the loss, even going as far to publish their NHL salaries. The players responded by not returning to Sweden during the NHL break, although that was unlikely since the Olympics were held in the same continent as their NHL teams and play resumed soon after the Olympics ended.

Another major surprise was the silver-medal finish of Team USA, which was not considered a contender as it was steeped heavily in over-30 veterans. Although it retained most of the players from the 1998 team which had performed below expectations, this time it was coached by Herb Brooks, who had been responsible for the "Miracle on Ice" over the Soviet Union during the 1980 Winter Olympics. Despite being close to the ends of their NHL careers, Mike Richter and Phil Housley put up phenomenal performances. Brett Hull, John LeClair, and Mike Modano formed the "Divine Line" which led the tournament in scoring. USA and Russia played to a 2–2 tie in their group game, drawing some comparisons to the famous 1980 Miracle game. Ending up, USA finished second behind Sweden in the round robin results.

USA and Russia met again in the semi-finals of the tournament. The USA's victory over Russia came coincidentally on the 22-year anniversary of the "Miracle on Ice", the upset of the Soviet Union team, at Lake Placid in 1980 (also a Friday). The Americans stormed out to a 3–0 lead for the first two periods, before withstanding a two-goal rally from the Russians to advance. Russian coach Slava Fetisov, one of the stars for the 1980 Soviet squad, complained about the selection of NHL referees to officiate Olympic matches (a stipulation by the NHL if most Olympic players are NHLers) and charged that officials were trying to fix a Canada-USA final for North American audiences. However, Russian goalie Nikolai Khabibulin thought that the refereeing was fair, having faced 38 shots in the first two periods and 49 overall.

Canada had a lackluster start, losing 5–2 to Sweden, only managing to defeat Germany by a score of 3–2, and drawing with the Czech Republic. These performances prompted an emotional response from Team Canada manager Wayne Gretzky, in particular the referee's failure to call a clear hit from behind on Canada's Theoren Fleury in the game against the Czech Republic. However, Canada improved in the elimination round, defeating Finland 2–1, and easily sweeping surprise semi-finalist Belarus 7–1.

Canada and the US faced off in the final. For both nations, the gold-medal game came coincidentally on the anniversary of each nation's last gold medal in men's Olympic hockey. Canada last won 50 years previously at the 1952 Winter Olympics when they tied the US 3–3 (Olympic ice hockey previously only had a round-robin portion). The US won their last gold medal when they defeated Finland two days after "The Miracle on Ice" in 1980. Both games, coincidentally, were played on a Sunday.

The Canada-USA final was tied at 2–2, however Canada then scored three goals to win 5–2. It was only the second time and first in 70 years that the US men's hockey team lost an Olympic game on home soil. The first loss came against Canada (a 2–1 OT loss) in their first game at the 1932 Winter Olympics in Lake Placid.

TV ratings for Canada vs USA gold medal matchup were the highest in Olympic history to that time. In the United States, NBC's live coverage of the gold medal hockey game drew a 10.7 rating, the highest-rated hockey game, Olympic or NHL, since the 1980 Winter Olympics and was the largest network hockey audience in the U.S. in 22 years. In Canada, the CBC said that the game drew 10.6 million viewers, making the game was the most-watched CBC Sports program. As the final seconds ticked away, veteran CBC Sports commentator Bob Cole called: "Now after 50 years, it's time for Canada to stand up and cheer. Stand up and cheer everybody! The Olympics Salt Lake City, 2002, men's ice hockey, gold medal: Canada!" The CBC also said that the 10.6 million viewers broke the previous record of 4.957 million viewers for Game 7 of the 1994 Stanley Cup Finals, another moment Cole himself called: "The New York Rangers have done it here on a hot June night in New York! The Rangers are Stanley Cup Champions!"

During the final, the legend of the lucky loonie was born when Canadian icemaker Trent Evans buried a one dollar coin (Loonie) under centre ice and both the Canadian men's and women's teams won gold.

Steve Yzerman and Brendan Shanahan became the second and third players to win the Olympic Gold Medal in hockey (with Team Canada) and the Stanley Cup (with the Detroit Red Wings) in the same year, the first to win an Olympic Gold and Stanley Cup was Ken Morrow in 1980. Chris Chelios and Brett Hull became the second and third players to win Olympic Silver Medal in hockey (with Team USA) and Stanley Cup in the same year (Sergei Fedorov was the first in 1998).

The format of the tournament was the same one used in the 1998 tournament in Nagano.  It was controversial because the National Hockey League clubs would not release their players for the preliminary round.  This severely hampered the campaigns of Germany and Slovakia, although the former country managed to qualify for the final group stage.  Also the final group stage was criticized as being meaningless since all of the teams qualified for the quarter-finals. The format was changed for the 2006 tournament in an effort to address these criticisms.

Qualifying

The final standings at the end of the 1999 IIHF World Championship were used to determine the path to the Olympic tournament.  The top six places were given direct entry to the first round, places seven and eight were given direct entry to the preliminary round, and all other participants were seeded in qualifying tournaments to fill the remaining six spots.  This chart shows the seeding path for all nations, in detail.

Preliminary round

Group A
Top team (shaded) advanced to the first round.

All times are local (UTC-7).

Group B
Top team (shaded) advanced to the first round.

All times are local (UTC-7).

Consolation round

13th place game

11th place game

9th place game

First round

Group C

All times are local (UTC-7).

Group D

All times are local (UTC-7).

Final round

Quarter-finals
All times are local (UTC-7).

Semi-finals
All times are local (UTC-7).

Bronze medal game
All times are local (UTC-7).

Gold medal game
All times are local (UTC-7).

Final rankings

 These standings are presented as the IIHF has them, however both the NHL and IOC maintain that all quarterfinal losers are ranked equal at 5th.LA84 foundation Ice Hockey Men Official Report of the XIX Olympic Winter Games, p. 323.

Statistics

Average age
Team USA was the oldest team in the tournament, averaging 31 years and 10 months. Team Slovakia was the youngest team in the tournament, averaging 26 years and 10 months. Gold medalists team Canada averaged 30 years and 3 months. Tournament average was 28 years and 9 months.

Scoring leaders
List shows the top ten skaters sorted by points, then goals.

GP = Games played; G = Goals; A = Assists; Pts = Points; +/− = Plus-minus; PIM = Penalties in minutes; POS = Position
Source: IIHF.com

Leading goaltenders
Only the top five goaltenders, based on save percentage, who have played at least 40% of their team's minutes, are included in this list.

TOI = Time on ice (minutes:seconds); GA = Goals against;  GAA = Goals against average; SA = Shots against; Sv% = Save percentage; SO = ShutoutsSource: IIHF.com

Awards

Media All-Stars
Goaltender:  Mike Richter
Defencemen:  Brian Leetch,  Chris Chelios
Forwards:  John LeClair,  Joe Sakic,  Mats Sundin
Most Valuable Player:  Joe Sakic
Best players selected by the directorate:
Best Goaltender:  Nikolai Khabibulin
Best Defenceman:  Chris Chelios
Best Forward:  Joe Sakic

References

External links
Official results for men's tournament 
Official structure and seeding for men's qualification and Olympic tournament 
Salt Lake City 2002 – Results – Ice hockey – Men

 
Men's
Men's events at the 2002 Winter Olympics